Grigol Mgaloblishvili (born 7 October 1973) is a Georgian politician and diplomat who has been Georgia's Permanent Representative to NATO since 26 June 2009. He briefly served as the Prime Minister of Georgia from 1 November 2008 to 6 February 2009.

Early life

Grigol Mgaloblishvili was born in Tbilisi, the capital of the then-Soviet Georgia, to an academic family.  He served as the Georgian Ambassador to Turkey until 27 October 2008 when President Mikheil Saakashvili proposed him for the position of the Prime Minister of Georgia to the Parliament of Georgia. Besides his native Georgian, he speaks English, Turkish, Russian and German.

Prime minister

Mgaloblishvili was approved as the Prime Minister on 1 November 2008.

In December 2008, Russian media widely picked up a report by Georgia's tabloid Alia claiming that an incident occurred between Mgaloblishvili and Saakashvili in which the latter allegedly punched Mgaloblishvili and threw a telephone at him. The story did not explain what provoked the president. Shortly afterwards, Mgaloblishvili left for Germany for a medical examination. Returning to Georgia, he called the "hype and rumors" ridiculous. President Saakashvili also responded to the rumors, saying that after Mgaloblishvili's return "Russian will calm down and focus more on global issues."

On 30 January 2009, during a press conference, Mgaloblishvili announced his resignation citing health problems and saying that he had suggested the President to consider nominating Nika Gilauri, the finance minister and first vice premier, for the prime minister's position.

Ambassador to NATO
On 26 June 2009, Mgaloblishvili was approved by the Parliament of Georgia as the country's Permanent Representative to NATO.

References

External links

Prime Ministers of Georgia
Heads of mission of Georgia (country) to NATO
1973 births
Living people
Ambassadors of Georgia (country) to Turkey
Politicians from Tbilisi
Alumni of Lincoln College, Oxford
21st-century politicians from Georgia (country)
Diplomats from Tbilisi